The men's 100 metres event was part of the track and field athletics programme at the 1924 Summer Olympics. This race was depicted in the film Chariots of Fire. The first two rounds were held on 6 July, with the semifinals and final on 7 July. Eighty-six sprinters from 34 countries competed. The event was won by Harold Abrahams of Great Britain—Great Britain's first Olympic gold medal in the men's 100 metres and only the second time that the United States failed to win (Reggie Walker of South Africa had won in 1908). Jackson Scholz kept the Americans on the podium with a silver. Arthur Porritt won the bronze, New Zealand's first medal in the event.

The Chariots of Fire film presents a fictionalized version of the event in which Eric Liddell, a devout Christian, dropped out shortly before the competition because the heat was on Sunday, and his faith compelled him to keep Sunday as the Sabbath. While the basic story is accurate, the true timeline was less dramatic, as "Liddell knew about the Olympic schedule several months in advance and never intended to run the 100 in Paris."

Background

This was the seventh time the event was held, having appeared at every Olympics since the first in 1896. For the first time (excluding the 1906 Intercalated Games), a defending gold medalist (Charley Paddock) attempted to retain his title. Two other 1920 finalists, Loren Murchison and Jackson Scholz, also returned. Other notable entrants included Great Britain's Harold Abrahams, a favorite along with Paddock.

Argentina, Brazil, Ecuador, Estonia, Haiti, Ireland (newly independent from Great Britain), Latvia, Mexico, the Philippines, Poland, and Turkey were represented in the event for the first time. The United States was the only nation to have appeared at each of the first seven Olympic men's 100 metres events.

Competition format

The event retained the four round format from 1920: heats, quarterfinals, semifinals, and a final. There were 17 heats, of 3–6 athletes each, with the top 2 in each heat advancing to the quarterfinals. The 34 quarterfinalists were placed into 6 heats of 5 or 6 athletes. Again, the top 2 advanced. There were 2 heats of 6 semifinalists, this time with the top 3 advancing to the 6-man final.

Records

Prior to this competition, the existing world and Olympic records were as follows:

No new records were set in 1924, though Harold Abrahams equalled the Olympic record three times.

Results

All times shown are in seconds.

Heats

The first round was held on 6 July. The first two runners of each heat qualified for the second round.

Heat 1

Heat 2

Heat 3

Heat 4

Heat 5

Heat 6

Heat 7

Heat 8

Heat 9

Heat 10

Heat 11

Heat 12

Heat 13

Heat 14

Heat 15

Heat 16

Heat 17

Quarterfinals

The quarterfinals were held on 6 July. The first two runners of each heat qualified for the semifinals.

Quarterfinal 1

Quarterfinal 2

Quarterfinal 3

Quarterfinal 4

Quarterfinal 5

Quarterfinal 6

Semifinals

The semifinals were held on 7 July. The first three runners from each semifinal qualified for the final.

Semifinal 1

Semifinal 2

Final

The final was held on 7 July.

References

External links
 https://web.archive.org/web/20100904130200/http://www.databaseolympics.com/games/gamessport.htm?g=8&sp=ATH
 

Men's 00100 metres
100 metres at the Olympics